Vergine e di nome Maria (Virgin and Called Mary) is a 1975 Italian comedy-drama film directed by Sergio Nasca. A few days after its first release it was confiscated for contempt of religion; it was subsequently re-edited and redistributed under the title Malía.

Cast 
 Turi Ferro: Don Vito 
 Andréa Ferréol: Maddalena 
 Cinzia De Carolis: Maria 
 Alvaro Vitali: Rocco 
 Clelia Matania: Anna
 Renato Pinciroli: Giuseppe 
 Leopoldo Trieste: Nicola 
 Enzo Cannavale: Simone 
 Jean Louis: Luca 
 Sandro Dori: Matteo 
 Marino Masè: Gabriele
 Tino Carraro: the Bishop 
 Giancarlo Badessi

References

External links

1975 films
Italian comedy-drama films
1975 comedy-drama films
1975 comedy films
1975 drama films
1970s Italian films